John Peter Larkindale  (born 1946) is a former New Zealand public servant and diplomat, whose overseas postings including ambassador to the Russian Federation and high commissioner to Australia.

Biography 
Larkindale was born in Wellington in 1946, to Robert and Liesel, Jewish migrants from Germany. Larkindale was educated at Wellington College.  He then studied chemistry at Victoria University of Wellington, graduating BSc and then MSc(Hons). His 1968 master's thesis, supervised by Alan Freeman, was titled Some intercalation compounds of boron nitride. Larkindale was awarded an 1851 Exhibition Scholarship, and he went on to complete a PhD at McGill University in Canada in 1971. His doctoral thesis, supervised by David J. Simkin, was titled Spectroscopic and theoretical studies of charge-transfer complexes.

Larkindale joined the staff of the Ministry of Foreign Affairs in 1972, and had postings to New Zealand's embassies in Vienna and Washington. He then served as the director of Pacific aid, based in Wellington and, later, Tokelau official secretary. Subsequently, he was the deputy head of mission in Beijing and then London. In 1994 he was appointed executive director of the Commonwealth Heads of Government (CHOGM) task force, responsible for organising the CHOGM summit held in Auckland the following year.

In the 1996 New Year Honours, Larkindale was appointed a Companion of the Queen's Service Order for public services.

Between 1996 and 1999, Larkindale was the New Zealand ambassador to the Russian Federation. Returning to Wellington, he was appointed deputy secretary of the Ministry of Foreign Affairs and Trade. Larkindale's final diplomatic appointment was as high commissioner to Australia, in which role he served from 2006 until his retirement in 2011.

Larkindale became a member of the board of the Institute of Public Administration New Zealand (IPANZ) in 2012, and in March 2013 he was elected president of IPANZ.

References

1946 births
Living people
People from Wellington City
People educated at Wellington College (New Zealand)
Victoria University of Wellington alumni
McGill University alumni
New Zealand chemists
Ambassadors of New Zealand to Russia
Ambassadors of New Zealand to Ukraine
High Commissioners of New Zealand to Australia
Companions of the Queen's Service Order